David Thompson (also Dave Thomas; born 4 January 1960) is an English writer who is the author of more than 100 books, largely dealing with rock and pop music, but also covering film, sports, philately, numismatics and erotica. He wrote regularly for Melody Maker and Record Collector in the 1980s, and has since contributed to magazines such as Mojo, Q, Rolling Stone and Goldmine.

Biography
Thompson was born in Bideford in Devon. In the late 1970s, he wrote and published a punk rock fanzine. In the 1980s, he was employed by Richard Desmond's Northern & Shell in the London Docklands. He moved to the United States in 1989. Among many other music publications, he has written for Alternative Press and Shindig!, as well as for the AllMusic website.

His first published book, U2: Stories for Boys (Plexus, 1985, under the pen name Dave Thomas), was the first biography of the band U2. His other book subjects include Depeche Mode, the Red Hot Chili Peppers, Phish, T. V. Smith and the Adverts, ZZ Top, Joan Jett, Perry Farrell, Patti Smith, Kurt Cobain, Deep Purple, Genesis and Simple Minds.

Thompson has also written extensively on David Bowie, including the biographies Moonage Daydream (1987) and Hallo Spaceboy (2006), as well as the semi-fictional To Major Tom (2000). In 2004, Helter Skelter published his book The Psychedelic Furs: Beautiful Chaos. Thompson's book Black and White and Blue: Adult Cinema from the Victorian Age to the VCR was published in 2007 by ECW Press. In March 2018, he published the book The Incomplete Angler - Ten Years of Fruits de Mer, which chronicles the first ten years of British psychedelic folk record label Fruits de Mer Records, along with an extensive discography of the company's output.

References

External links
"It's Not Only Rock'n'Roll" (Dave Thompson Books) 
Dave Thompson profile at Goodreads
 Short biography at Rock's Back Pages
Biography at CG Publishing

1960 births
Living people
Writers from Bideford
English writers about music
English music journalists
English sportswriters
English male non-fiction writers
English biographers
British film historians
English numismatists